Diego Armando Chávez Ramos (born 7 March 1993) alias Chaveta is a Peruvian footballer who plays for club Club Universitario de Deportes in the Liga 1. His assertiveness in attack and security in defense earned him to be promoted to the first squad where he gained experience and became a regular in the starting eleven.

Club career 
In January 2012, Chávez was promoted to the Universitario first team by manager José Chemo del Solar for the start of the 2012 season. He made his Torneo Descentralizado debut on 19 February 2012 in the first round of the season away to Inti Gas Deportes. He played the entire match, but his side conceded a goal in the 93rd minute from Luis Coronado and lost the match 1–0.
He returned to the starting eleven in Round 5 away to the Elías Aguirre Stadium against Juan Aurich, and the match eventually finished in a 1–0 win for the home team.

Chávez signed for Deportivo Binacional on 16 December 2018 for the 2019 season.

Honours

Club
Universitario de Deportes
 Torneo Descentralizado (1): 2013

References

External links 
 

1993 births
Living people
People from Ica, Peru
Peruvian footballers
Club Universitario de Deportes footballers
Sport Rosario footballers
Unión Huaral footballers
Deportivo Binacional FC players
José Gálvez FBC footballers
Peruvian Primera División players
Association football fullbacks
Peru under-20 international footballers